Hiroki Kondo and Yi Chu-huan were the defending champions, but lost in the quarterfinals.
Philipp Oswald and Mate Pavić won the title, defeating Andrea Arnaboldi and Matteo Viola 6–3, 3–6, [10–2] in the final.

Seeds

Draw

Draw

References
 Main draw

Men's Doubles